Grown-ish is an American sitcom series and a spin-off of the ABC series Black-ish. The single-camera comedy follows the children of the Johnson family (from Black-ish) as they go to college and begin their journeys to adulthood, only to quickly discover that not everything goes their way once they leave the nest; the first four seasons follow eldest daughter Zoey (Yara Shahidi) as she attends college, while the fifth season onward follows eldest son, former college dropout and Zoey's younger brother Junior (Marcus Scribner) as he also attends college after Zoey's graduation. The series premiered on January 3, 2018, on Freeform.

In January 2020, the series was renewed for a fourth season, while the second half of the third season premiered on January 21, 2021. The fourth season premiered on July 8, 2021. The second half of the fourth season premiered on January 27, 2022. In March 2022, Freeform renewed the series for a fifth season which premiered on July 20, 2022. In January 2023, the series was renewed for a sixth season.

Series overview

Episodes

Backdoor pilot (2017)

Season 1 (2018)

Season 2 (2019)

Season 3 (2020–21)
The second half of this season was delayed by a year due to the COVID-19 pandemic

Season 4 (2021–22)

Season 5 (2022–23)

Ratings

Season 1

Season 2

Season 3

Season 4

Season 5

References

External links
 
 

Lists of American sitcom episodes
Lists of American comedy-drama television series episodes
Black-ish
Split television seasons